Centerville High School is a public school of secondary education for grades 9–12 located in Centerville, Ohio, situated ten miles south of Dayton. It is the only high school in the Centerville City School District, which also includes three middle schools, six elementary schools, and two K–1 schools, or "primary villages." The district serves all of the city of Centerville and Washington Township, as well as a portion of the city of Kettering.

History
Washington Township first began offering formal education in 1803 with a school building housing grades 1–6. Nine one-room elementary schools were also erected. In 1848, the Old Stone Academy was constructed and the first high school courses were offered. Private schools over the blacksmith shop and in Old Township Hall also offered similar courses.

In 1885, the Washington Township High School was built at 101 West Franklin Street. The first class graduated in 1890. In 1924, the Magsig building was built as a centralized school (grades 1-12). Washington Township High School became a member of the North Central Association of Colleges and Secondary Schools in 1951. In April 1955, the Central Unit of what is now Cline Elementary School was opened, and junior high and the three-year high school were moved there. Kindergarten was added at Magsig. The name of the high school officially became Centerville High School in 1963. In 1966, CHS became a four-year high school with classes split by department between Magsig and Cline (then known as the South building) and students walking back and forth between classes. Tower Heights Middle School and Hithergreen Middle School were built for grades 6–8 in 1966. Hadley Watts Middle School became the third middle school in 1969. In 1973, the first part of the present-day high school was completed, becoming the East Unit in addition to the Magsig and South Units.

In 1975–76, the entire high school was finally taught inside the current building with Central, East, and West units. Magsig was changed to a middle school, and the old South was changed to W.O. Cline Elementary School. The stadium and athletic fields were built behind the high school in 1979 and the auxiliary gym, as well as the new South Unit in 1980. In 1982, Hithergreen Middle School and Village South Elementary School were closed. Hithergreen   became a community center for active seniors. In 1991, Village South was reopened as Centerville Kindergarten Village. During the 1999–2000 school year, the Athletic Entrance, Athletic Office, and weight room were completed.

In May 2005, voters in Centerville/Washington Township supported a $4.4 million operating levy and a $2.5 million bond issue designed to compensate for a predicted district enrollment increase to 9000 students. Part of this levy includes a new addition to the front. The addition, completed during the summer of 2007, includes 9 new chemistry and physics classrooms and 3 new labs, a new main entrance, additional classroom space, and improved cafeteria commons areas. This addition is now finished and used daily by the students. The new cafeteria areas provide several booths to students and less space for the lunch line area.

Athletics
The athletic teams at Centerville are known as the Elks. Centerville is a member of the Greater Western Ohio Conference. 16 sports are offered for boys and 18 sports are offered for girls. The Elks have a tradition of strong community and school spirit and have had success at both the GWOC and the OHSAA level. Centerville's student section is known as the "Herd."

State championships
This is a list of Centerville's state championships in the Ohio High School Athletic Association:

 Baseball - 1928
 Girls Gymnastics – 1977
 Ice Hockey – 1979
 Boys Gymnastics – 1980
 Girls Track and Field – 1981
 Boys Soccer – 1984
 Girls Golf – 1995, 2022
 Girls Swimming and Diving – 2004
 Girls Bowling – 2008, 2019
 Girls Cross Country – 2014, 2015, 2016, 2017, 2020
Boys Basketball - 2021
Boys Bowling - 2022

Other titles not sponsored by the OHSAA

The boys' volleyball team has won three state championships (1994, 2001, 2002) as members of the Ohio High School Boys Volleyball Association.

The Centerville Jazz Band (Marching Band) won Grand National Finals in 1992.

Notable alumni

References

External links
 

Educational institutions established in 1885
High schools in Montgomery County, Ohio
Public high schools in Ohio
1885 establishments in Ohio